East Kilbride (Gaelic: Cille Bhrìghde an Ear) is a constituency of the Scottish Parliament (Holyrood) covering part of the council area of South Lanarkshire. It elects one Member of the Scottish Parliament (MSP) by the plurality (first past the post) method of election. Also, however, it is one of nine constituencies in the Central Scotland electoral region, which elects seven additional members, in addition to nine constituency MSPs, to produce a form of proportional representation for the region as a whole.

The seat has been held by Collette Stevenson of the Scottish National Party since the 2021 Scottish Parliament election.

Electoral region 

The other eight constituencies of the Central Scotland region are Airdrie and Shotts, Coatbridge and Chryston, Cumbernauld and Kilsyth, Falkirk East, Falkirk West, Hamilton, Larkhall and Stonehouse, Motherwell and Wishaw and Uddingston and Bellshill.

The region covers all of the Falkirk council area, all of the North Lanarkshire council area and part of the South Lanarkshire council area.

Constituency boundaries and council area 

The  constituency was created at the same time as the Scottish Parliament, in 1999, with the name and boundaries of an existing Westminster constituency. In 2005, however, Scottish Westminster (House of Commons) constituencies were mostly replaced with new constituencies.

The Holyrood constituency is one of five covering the South Lanarkshire council area, the others being Hamilton, Larkhall and Stonehouse, which is within the Central Scotland region, Rutherglen, within the Glasgow region, and Clydesdale, within the South Scotland region. Part of the Uddingston and Bellshill constituency includes parts of South Lanarkshire and is part of the Central Scotland region.

Covering the entirety of the large town of East Kilbride, the electoral Wards of the United Kingdom wards used in the creation of the constituency are:

East Kilbride Central North, East Kilbride Central South, East Kilbride East, East Kilbride South, East Kilbride West

Constituency profile
BBC profile for 2016 election:

Member of the Scottish Parliament

Election results

2020s

2010s

2000s

1990s

Footnotes

External links

Constituencies of the Scottish Parliament
1999 establishments in Scotland
Constituencies established in 1999
Scottish Parliament constituencies and regions 1999–2011
Scottish Parliament constituencies and regions from 2011
East Kilbride
Politics of South Lanarkshire